Alan John Barrett (14 November 1912 – 8 April 1961) was a British rower who competed in the 1936 Summer Olympics.

In 1936 he was a crew member of the British boat which won the silver medal in the coxless four event.

References

External links 
 
 
 

1912 births
1961 deaths
British male rowers
Olympic rowers of Great Britain
Rowers at the 1936 Summer Olympics
Olympic silver medallists for Great Britain
Olympic medalists in rowing
Medalists at the 1936 Summer Olympics